Kankesanthurai fort  was a small fort, built by the Dutch in Kankesanthurai, Sri Lanka. The fort was destroyed and there are no visible remains. Unlike other Dutch forts in Sri Lanka, there are no maps and little information on the fort. It is reported that there was a fort called Kankesanthurai fort although there is no detailed information on the fort itself.

References

Further reading 
 

Dutch forts in Sri Lanka
Forts in Northern Province, Sri Lanka